Harutaeographa caerulea is a moth of the family Noctuidae. It is found in Nepal and Thailand.

Subspecies
Harutaeographa caerulea caerulea (Nepal: Kathmandu Valley)
Harutaeographa caerulea rubrigrapha Hreblay & Ronkay, 1999 (Thailand: Chiang Mai)

References

Moths described in 1993
Orthosiini